Jeanne Moutoussamy-Ashe (born July 9, 1951) is an American photographer and activist. She is best known for her work in magazines, newspapers, and several photography books, and also as an AIDS activist.

Early life and education
Moutoussamy-Ashe was born in Chicago, Illinois, on July 9, 1951.  Her mother's family was from Arkansas, and her father's family came from New Orleans and Guadeloupe. Both parents were professionals in art-related fields. Her mother, Elizabeth Rose Hunt Moutoussamy, was an interior designer, and her father, John Warren Moutoussamy, was an architect. They encouraged her to pursue her own artistic interests by enrolling her in weekend classes at the Art Institute of Chicago when she was eight years old. At the age of 18 a family friend, Frank Stewart, introduced her to photography. After her application to the Cooper Union School of Art was rejected, she studied with Garry Winogrand for a summer and then reapplied. Moutoussamy-Ashe went on to earn her BFA from the Cooper Union in 1975. Before graduating, she spent her junior year in West Africa to complete independent study in photography.

Career
After graduating, Moutoussamy-Ashe worked as a graphic artist and in television photojournalism for WNBC and WNEW in New York, and also for PM Magazine. Her friend, Gordon Parks suggested that she obtain credentials to photograph the 1968 United Negro College Fund Tennis Tournament organized by tennis champion Arthur Ashe.

Over the course of her career, Moutoussamy-Ashe has contributed photographs to many magazines and newspapers, including Life, Smithsonian, Sports Illustrated, People Weekly, Ebony, Black Enterprise, World Tennis, Self, and Essence.

Personal life
Moutoussamy-Ashe married Arthur Ashe in 1977.  In December 1986, Ashe and Moutoussamy-Ashe adopted a daughter, whom they named Camera after Moutoussamy-Ashe's profession.  Nineteen months later, Arthur was diagnosed as HIV positive, after contracting the disease via a blood transfusion he received during heart bypass surgery.

Recognition
Moutoussamy-Ashe has participated in a number of individual and group exhibits in cities around the United States and Europe, and her work is included in the permanent collections of several museums, including the Museum of Modern Art in New York, the Schomburg Center for Research in Black Culture, the Smithsonian National Museum of African American History and Culture, the National Portrait Gallery, and the Whitney Museum of American Art. It is also in private collections, including Oprah Winfrey's. She has received a number of awards, including the Essence Photography Literary Award (2008), and a Mayoral Citation from the City of Chicago (1986). She also holds two honorary Doctor of Fine Arts degrees, from Queens College (2002, Charlotte, North Carolina) and Long Island University (C.W. Post Campus, 1990).

Publications

Books
 1982: Daufuskie Island, a Photographic Essay. Columbia, SC: University of South Carolina Press.
 1993: Daddy and Me: A Photo Story of Arthur Ashe and His Daughter, Camera. New York: A.A. Knopf: Distributed by Random House, Inc.
 1993: Viewfinders: Black Women Photographers. New York; London: Writers & Readers.
 2001: The African Flower. New York, N.Y.: Jeanne Moutoussamy-Ashe.
 2011: Arthur Ashe: Out of the Shadow. New York, NY: Arthur Ashe Learning Center.
 2007: Intimate Portraits: Jeanne Moutoussamy-Ashe. New York: Bill Hodges Gallery.

References

External links
 Jeanne Moutoussamy-Ashe CV

1951 births
Living people
Cooper Union alumni
Photographers from Illinois
African-American photographers
20th-century American photographers
21st-century American photographers
Artists from Chicago
School of the Art Institute of Chicago alumni
20th-century American women photographers
21st-century American women photographers